Bengt Holgersson (born September 16, 1941) was the first Governor of Skåne County after a merger of Malmöhus County and Kristianstad County in 1997. Holgersson was involved in a corruption scandal in April 2006. Both Holgersson and municipal commissioner Ilmar Reepalu were tried for corruption regarding a trip to South Africa which they had accepted from Sigma AB. In the end Both Holgersson and Reepalu were acquitted. In 2006 he was succeeded by Göran Tunhammar as Governor of Skåne.

References 

1941 births
Living people
Governors of Skåne County